Bob Andrews (30 December 1941 – 9 July 2005) was an  Australian rules footballer who played with North Melbourne in the Victorian Football League (VFL).

Notes

External links 

1941 births
2005 deaths
Australian rules footballers from Victoria (Australia)
North Melbourne Football Club players